The Belgian provincial, municipal and district elections of 2018 took place on Sunday 14 October 2018. They are organised by the respective regions:
 Brussels with 19 municipalities
 Flanders with 5 provinces and 300 (down from 308) municipalities
 In the city of Antwerp, elections will also be held for its nine districts
 Wallonia with 5 provinces and 262 municipalities
 In the German-speaking Community, the elections are organised by that community rather than the Walloon Region

In the municipalities with language facilities of Voeren, Comines-Warneton and the 6 of the Brussels Periphery, the aldermen and members of the OCMW/CPAS council are directly elected.

General
Although the laws governing local elections differ per region (Brussels, Flanders and Wallonia) and per level (provinces, municipalities, districts and OCMW/CPAS), they are all similar, with all of the elections being held on the same second Sunday of October for a six-year term.

Between the 2012 and 2018 local elections, elections were only held in May 2014 (European, federal and regional), giving an unusually long period without elections in Belgium. The next European, federal and regional elections will be held in May 2019, only a few months after the October 2018 local elections.

Parties

National political parties are mostly separated by language community. A lot of municipalities have local parties as well as a presence of national parties. Here are the most important national parties:
 Dutch-speaking parties, generally contending in Flanders and Brussels: N-VA (nationalist), CD&V (Christian democrats), sp.a (socialists), Open VLD (liberals), Groen (ecologists), Vlaams Belang (far-right), PVDA (Marxist)
 French-speaking parties, generally contending in Wallonia and Brussels: PS (socialists), MR (liberals), DéFI (regionalists/liberals), CdH (Christian democrats), Ecolo (ecologists), PTB (Marxist)
 German-speaking parties, generally contending in several German-speaking municipalities in Wallonia

Voters
All Belgian citizens aged 18 or over are automatically registered and are obliged to participate in the election. Foreigners, both EU and non-EU, have the right to register to vote.

The number of voters is as follows as of 1 August 2018:

Brussels
The municipal councils in the 19 municipalities of the Brussels-Capital Region were elected. These municipalities do not belong to any province.

Since 2014, the regional electoral legislation has been modified to forbid lists with only one candidate, officially to enforce the sex parity principle, officiously to evict lists from an Islamist party. This 'ISLAM' party's leader had announced in April that it would present lists in 14 out of 19 communes. Finally, there are only two, in Brussels and Molenbeek. A third one in Anderlecht, headed by the aforementioned leader who had been elected in 2012, was invalidated because it hadn't been able to collect 100 signatures for its act of presentation. In April and begin September several politicians, amidst big media interest for this minuscule party (2 councillors, less than 10 members), had announced they would submit a law proposal to forbid it as its leader had multiplied controversial attitudes towards women and announcements that he aimed to introduce sharia in Belgium.

The definitive candidates lists have been published online on 21 September 2018, there are 4,104 candidates on 152 lists, they were 3,965 in 2012.

Brussels
Following the 2012 election, Freddy Thielemans (PS) continued as mayor, heading a coalition of socialists (PS-sp.a) and liberals (MR-Open Vld). In December 2013, Thielemans retired and was succeeded by Yvan Mayeur (PS). In 2017, a scandal emerged surrounding Samusocial, an organisation for homeless people where board members received excessive compensations for supposed meetings. Mayeur was forced to resign and was succeeded by Philippe Close (PS). The coalition was no longer supported by sp.a, and sp.a alderwoman Ans Persoons quit. Persoons and sp.a will contend the election on their own as Change.Brussels.

An October 2017 poll showed the Green parties surpassing the socialists as largest party.

In 2018, new financial-political scandals emerged regarding at least three organisations (Gial, Brinfin and Neo) where people were reimbursed as self-employed where they should have been actually employed.

A debate among the main Dutch-speaking candidates was held on 4 September.

Brussels is the only Belgian commune where two Islamic parties contend this election, Islam and its splinter party Salem, the first with two candidates (a father and his daughter), the second with three. Islam had 2 councillors in 2012, one in Anderlecht, the other in Molenbeek, both elected on one-person lists. The third list, in Brussels, failed to get a councillor elected in 2012. This time, the party has only been able to present lists of two candidates in Molenbeek and Brussels. There is a third Islamic party, limited to the province of Liège, the Movement for Education (MPE), which presents lists in three communes, Liège, Dison and Fléron, two one-candidate lists and one three-candidates list.

Opinion polling:

Schaerbeek
In 1994, a new coalition took power in Schaerbeek against the former Liberal (PRL) majority that had backed far right mayor . This coalition included former 'Nolsists', under the leadership of incumbent mayor Francis Duriau, the FDF of Bernard Clerfayt, Ecolo, the PSC and the PS (the Flemish SP competed apart, on a common list with a small local movement, IDS). The coalition was renewed in 2000, without the PSC but with the MR which competed under the Liste du Bourgmestre (Mayor's List) flag, uniting the former PRL and the FDF. In 2006, the coalition excluded the PS, which had among its councillors a controversial Turkish member of the Grey Wolves. This provoked the exclusion of Ecolo by the PS in the ruling coalitions e.g. in Brussels and Molenbeek. In 2012, the PS was maintained in the opposition, while the CDH (4 seats) entered it with 2 aldermen, and the local MR chapter broke up as the federal party forbade any common list with its former FDF partner, but a majority of the local chapter chose to go forward with the (predominantly FDF) Mayor's List as 'Independent Liberals'.

The situation before the 2018 elections is quite different from the two previous ones. In 2006 and 2012, federal Vice-Premier Laurette Onkelinx led the PS list against the Mayor's List, overtly hoping to supersede it and take the mayorship. In both elections, the Ecolo list was led by a former federal leader, Isabelle Durant, who chose to keep its alliance with FDF Bernard Clerfayt. In 2017, both Durant and Onkelinx resigned from the municipal council and there are no notorious followers in sight. PS federal deputy Ahmed Laaouej declined the offer to move from Koekelberg to Schaerbeek to replace her. In 2015, the CDH fraction was halved with the exclusion of Regional deputy Mahinur Özdemir, officially for refusing to recognize the existence of the 1915 Armenian genocide. Another Turkish CDH councillor left the CDH group after this exclusion.

Apart from the New Flemish Alliance and the Flemish Interest (Vlaams Belang) lists, Flemish parties have common lists with their Francophone counterpart: PS-SP.A, CDH-CD&V, Ecolo-Groen. The Open VLD, whose only councillor sits within the majority, has decided to join the Liste du Bourgmestre (Mayor's List), which includes DéFI (new name of the FDF) candidates, including the mayor himself, and former MR.

Opinion polling:

Other municipalities
 Ganshoren: Pierre Kompany, the father of Vincent Kompany, becomes the first black mayor in Belgium.
 Forest/Vorst: Stéphane Roberti (Ecolo) becomes mayor, succeeding Marc-Jean Ghyssels (PS).

Flanders

Procedures and changes
In Flanders, the elections are mainly regulated by the Local and Provincial Electoral Act of 8 July 2011. Below are a few key dates set out in the Act applied to these elections:

All residents aged 18 and higher with Belgian citizenship are obligated to vote. Foreigners, both EU and non-EU, have the right to vote. A May 2017 proposal to lower the voting age to 16 was blocked by government party N-VA.

Minister of Local Government Homans defined by order of 31 May 2018 the 163 municipalities that vote electronically; the other 145 municipalities vote by paper ballot.

Fifteen Flemish municipalities will merge into seven per 1 January 2019, when the legislative period elected in these elections starts. This reduces the number of Flemish municipalities from 308 to 300.

By order of 25 May 2018, the Flemish Government defined the number of councillors to be elected. In total, 7,398 municipal councillors will be elected in Flanders, a decrease of 66 compared to 2012. Thirty municipalities see an increase of two councillors, whereas in Ardooie and Ypres the population decreased, leading to a decrease of two councillors. The overall decrease however is mostly due to the merging of municipalities.

Political background

The following political parties have a common regional list numbers:
  sp.a
  N-VA
  CD&V
  Groen
  Vlaams Belang
  Open Vld

While N-VA has replaced CD&V's longstanding dominance nationally (in the 2010 and 2014 elections), the latter party retains its advantage on a local level. N-VA was able to break through in a lot of places locally in 2012, but CD&V remained the largest party in many municipalities, especially in rural ones.

Open Vld has strongholds both in rural and urban areas; for example the mayors of Mechelen and Kortrijk are Open Vld members. Sp.a tends to dominate in cities; however, it lost Antwerp in 2012 to N-VA, and Hasselt's mayoralty to CD&V in 2016. Gent's and Leuven's sp.a mayors are retiring, posing further threats to the party's power in cities. Sp.a chairman John Crombez suggested he would quit if his party's results are bad.

Groen only has two mayors, and Vlaams Belang is nowhere in power.

Provincial elections
The provincial councils of Antwerp, Flemish Brabant, East Flanders, West Flanders and Limburg will be elected. The Flemish Government reduced the total number of provincial councillors from 351 to 175: 31 instead of 63 for Limburg and 36 instead of 72 for the other four provinces. Councillors are elected for a six-year term, starting on the first working day in December following the elections, thus 3 December 2018.

Municipal elections
The municipal councils in all municipalities will be elected. Fifteen municipalities will be merged into seven, effective 1 January 2019, thus elections will be held for 300 rather than the current 308 municipalities. In each municipality, 7 to 55 councillors will be elected at-large depending on the population as of 1 January 2018. Councillors are elected for a six-year term, starting on the first working day in January following the elections, thus 2 January 2019.

Provincial capitals

Aalst
Aalst (in East Flanders) is governed by a coalition of N-VA, CD&V and SD&P (a local social democratic party who split from sp.a, who no longer wished to support the coalition). Mayor is Christoph D'Haese (N-VA). Ilse Uyttersprot has announced that she would challenge Christoph D'Haese for mayor. Largest opposition party is Open Vld, who put forth Jean-Jacques De Gucht as main candidate.

 Split from Socialist Party Differently

Opinion polling:

Antwerp
Antwerp (in Antwerp) is governed by a coalition of N-VA, CD&V and Open Vld. Incumbent mayor Bart De Wever (N-VA) is expected to run for a second term. CD&V will not form a joint list with sp.a as they did in the 2012 elections. Sp.a, which was previously in power for decades, is the largest opposition party in the 2013–2018 term. On 17 November 2016, CD&V announced that Deputy Prime Minister Kris Peeters will move from Puurs to Antwerp to be their main candidate. This will pit two of the most popular politicians against each other in the biggest city of Flanders.
Secretary of State Philippe De Backer will be Open Vld's main candidate, whereas Filip Dewinter will again be the candidate of Vlaams Belang. The pan-European party Volt Europa will team up with the local Pirate Party and field one list under the name "Paars" ("Purple").

On 13 October 2017, sp.a and Groen announced they would form a joint list, including independents, under the name Samen ("together"), led by Groen politician Wouter Van Besien, and third place for sp.a politician . However, following scandals involving Meeuws, Groen decided to end the collaboration in January 2018. Sp.a decided to field independent Jinnih Beels as main candidate, with second place for Meeuws.

Kris Peeters surprisingly said he has a chance of becoming mayor even if his party CD&V only receives 5% of the vote and is needed for a coalition.

The elections resulted in a narrow majority for the incumbent coalition, leading De Wever to look for a different coalition. Initially he tried with Groen, but their positions are too different. Eventually N-VA, sp.a and Open Vld formed a coalition.

Opinion polling:

Most Favorable mayor:

score on scale of one to ten

Bruges

Bruges (in West Flanders) is governed by a coalition of sp.a and CD&V, led by mayor Renaat Landuyt (sp.a). The largest opposition party is N-VA; Pol Van Den Driessche will be its main candidate.

CD&V became the largest party; Dirk De fauw will become mayor, heading a coalition of CD&V, sp.a and Open Vld.

Ghent

Ghent (in East Flanders) is governed by a coalition of sp.a-Groen and Open Vld.

 was selected to be CD&V's candidate, but she also resigned for a different reason. Former director of the Flemish Catholic education  will stand for CD&V instead.

Elke Sleurs quit as Secretary of State in order to be N-VA's candidate, but after a dispute with Siegfried Bracke, the party decided in January 2018 to put forward MEP Anneleen Van Bossuyt as main candidate.

Mathias De Clercq will remain the main candidate of Open Vld, which will thus be the only major list headed by the same candidate as in 2012.

One of the main topics is the implementation of a traffic circulation plan in 2017, which increased the car-free area in the city centre and divided the city into several zones for access by car, in order to improve air quality and stimulate public transportation and cycle use.

The sp.a-Groen kartel lost significantly, mostly the sp.a faction, but together they remained the largest bloc. Open Vld gained significantly, becoming the largest single party. Open Vld wants to cooperate with CD&V. Since neither bloc has a majority, the four parties will try forming a coalition together, but it was uncertain at first as to whether Filip Watteeuw (Groen) or Mathias De Clercq (Open Vld) will become mayor. On 30 November, the four parties announced the formation of their coalition with De Clercq as mayor.

Opinion polling:

Hasselt

N-VA is the largest opposition party.

Minister of Defence Steven Vandeput (N-VA) becomes the new mayor in a coalition of N-VA, sp.a-Groen and Open Vld. The outgoing mayor's party, CD&V, becomes opposition.

Opinion polling:

Kortrijk 
Vincent Van Quickenborne is the incumbent mayor of Kortrijk (in West Flanders), with a coalition of Open Vld, N-VA and sp.a. With this coalition, he ousted largest party CD&V in 2012.

Now Open Vld became the largest party, allowing Van Quickenborne to continue governing.

Leuven

Leuven (in Flemish Brabant) is governed by a coalition of sp.a and CD&V. Louis Tobback (sp.a), mayor since 1995, announced he will step down at the end of the term.  will replace him as main candidate of sp.a. The largest opposition parties are N-VA and Groen. CD&V's main candidate will be Carl Devlies, first alderman in Leuven, while N-VA's main candidate will be Lorin Parys, member of the Flemish Parliament.

Following the election, sp.a, Groen and CD&V formed a coalition with Mohamed Ridouani as mayor.

Mechelen

Mechelen (in Antwerp) is governed by a coalition of Vld-Groen-m+, N-VA and CD&V, headed by mayor Bart Somers (Open Vld). The opposition parties are sp.a and Vlaams Belang.

Vld-Groen-M+ received an absolute majority of seats in the election.

Opinion polling:

Ostend

Incumbent mayor and Minister of State Johan Vande Lanotte (sp.a) announced he wants to run with a "citizens' movement". The local sp.a will run as an open list with independents under the name "Stadslijst" ("City's list"). Flemish Minister Bart Tommelein (Open Vld) wants to challenge him as mayor.

Tommelein formed a coalition of his party Open Vld together with Groen, CD&V and N-VA, ousting Vande Lanotte as mayor.

Other notable results 
West Flanders
 In Middelkerke, Jean-Marie Dedecker's list received an absolute majority.
 No election was held in Zuienkerke, as only one list was submitted. All its candidates were automatically elected.
East Flanders
 In Ninove, "Forza Ninove", the local Vlaams Belang, received 40% of the votes, leading to uncertainty who will form a coalition, as no other party wants to cooperate with them.
Antwerp
 In Brasschaat, N-VA with Federal Minister Jan Jambon received an absolute majority.
Flemish Brabant
 In Aarschot, Open Vld party leader Gwendolyn Rutten will become mayor.
 In Grimbergen, "Vernieuwing" ("Renewal") became the largest party and formed a coalition with Open Vld and N-VA. However, "Vernieuwing" are mostly ex-Vlaams Belang politicians and the Open Vld national party decided that its local chapter cannot cooperate with them.

Wallonia
The Walloon Government decided not to use electronic voting and only use paper ballots. The German-speaking Community however, which organises municipal elections in its area since 2015, is using electronic voting only.

Provincial elections
The provincial councils of Namur, Walloon Brabant, Liège, Hainaut and Luxembourg were elected. The numbers of councillors are unchanged compared to 2012.

 * includes the councillors elected on the German-speaking lists

Municipal elections
The municipal councils in the 262 municipalities will be elected. In each municipality, 7 to 55 councillors will be elected at-large depending on the population as of 1 January 2018. Councillors are elected for a six-year term, starting on the first Monday in December following the elections, thus 3 December 2018.

A total of 5,370 municipal councillors are up for election, an increase of 64 compared to 2012 due to population increase.

Arlon

Arlon (in Luxembourg) is governed by a coalition of cdH and PS. Vincent Magnus of the cdH is the incumbent mayor. The PS enters the election with an open list under the name "Pour vouS" ("For you"), their main candidate is current alderman André Perpète.

Charleroi

Charleroi (in Hainaut) is governed by a coalition of PS, MR and cdH. Paul Magnette (PS) is the incumbent mayor. Local far right list FN Belge changes into "AGIR", while the cdH contends as "C+".

Opinion polling:

Liège
Liège (in Liège) is governed by a coalition of PS and cdH, with Willy Demeyer of the PS as mayor. Currently the MR is the biggest opposition party, but the PTB is expected to grow into one of the big contenders in 2018. Popular PTB politician Raoul Hedebouw, who lives in Liège, has stated that he's not interested in running for mayor. Ecolo will come up as a list with independents under the name "Vert Ardent".

Opinion polling:

Mons
Mons (in Hainaut) is governed by a coalition of PS and cdH. Former prime minister Elio Di Rupo is incumbent mayor, but he will not run for re-election. Instead the PS list will be led by first alderman Nicolas Martin. The MR will run as "Mons en mieux!" ("Better Mons") with Georges-Louis Bouchez as main candidate, while cdH renamed itself "Agora - Agir pour Mons" ("Act for Mons").

Opinion polling:

Namur
Namur (in Namur) is governed by a coalition of cdH, MR and Ecolo. Maxime Prévot of the cdH is the incumbent mayor.

Opinion polling:

Wavre
Wavre (in Walloon Brabant) is governed by a majority of LB (La Liste du Bourgmestre, or "the Mayor's List"), which is the election list of the local MR faction. The incumbent mayor is federal Prime Minister Charles Michel, although he is currently only mayor in title. Françoise Pigeolet replaces him in performing the mayoral duties. Charles Michel announced that he will not succeed himself, as he wishes to concentrate on his duties as prime minister. The list of LB will be headed by Françoise Pigeolet.

References

External links
 Elections Directorate of the Federal Public Service Interior
 Official site for the elections in Flanders
 Official site for the elections in Brussels
 Official site for the elections in Wallonia
 Election site of the Walloon local TV broadcasters
 Official site for the elections in the German-speaking Community
 Electoral leaflets and posters (site map for Brussels, Flanders, Wallonia), Tractothèque

2018 elections in Belgium
2018
October 2018 events in Belgium